Titanopsis is a genus of about 10 species of succulent plants of the family Aizoaceae, indigenous to the arid regions of South Africa and Namibia.

The name Titanopsis is derived from the Greek (god), Titan, the sun, and opsis, appearance, from the sun-like appearance of the flower.

Distribution
The genus has a disjunct distribution, occurring in three separate areas of southern Africa: southern Namibia, the region around the south-eastern border of Namibia and a larger area spanning between the former Cape Province and Orange Free State in South Africa. This unusual distribution means that the different Titanopsis species live in different rainfall systems - either summer or winter rainfall depending on the species.

Description

They are small plants, with rosette up to 10 cm high.

Leaves are up to 3 cm with truncate tip and rough warty little tubercles at the apex of the leaves. They look like limestone and are hard to see in the wild.

Yellow flowers with 2 cm diameter appear in late fall.

Species
Plants of the World Online accepts the following species:

Cultivation

Cultivation is easy with full sun, very well-drained soil, and attention to the natural rainfall of the particular species' habitat.

The more popular species from the eastern areas, such as Titanopsis calcarea, fulleri and luederitzii are adapted to summer rainfall, while those from further west, rarer species such as Titanopsis schwantesii and hugo-schlecteri, are adapted to winter rainfall, when they also flower.

The plants are calcicole (=they appreciate calcareous soils), but any typical loose succulent soil mix is suitable. 
Division of larger clumps is possible in some cases, but as most species have tuberous rootstocks and offset slowly, seed production is the most common method of propagation.

References

External links

Aizoaceae
Aizoaceae genera